Storm windows are windows that are mounted outside or inside of the main glass windows of a house. Storm windows exist in North America, but are uncommon in continental Europe, where double, triple or quadruple glazing is prevalent. Storm windows can be made of glass, rigid plastic panels, or flexible plastic sheets; and may be permanently or temporarily mounted. They function similarly to insulated glazing. The term may also refer to a small openable flap found in the side window on light aircraft.

In the United States, the older style of this window is often referred to as a "storm sash".

On modern houses they serve on existing windows in order to improve their thermal insulation and soundproofing. Aside from insulation, storm windows provide an additional measure of protection for homes against damages to costly glass panes during inclement weather such as hail. On older houses, storm windows were installed in autumn when window screens were removed. Later units combined the storm and screen pieces. Similarly, storm doors (also called "screen doors") allow similar energy savings with less efficient primary doors – and allow a screen for summer ventilation.

Energy upgrade
Modern storm windows are a typical energy upgrade solution for cold climates. They are mostly intended to improve the insulation value (R-value) of existing windows, especially single-glazed units.

Advantages and disadvantages
Storm windows can be very cost effective in cold climates. They are inexpensive, and can reduce heat loss by up to 50%, increasing the building's comfort and reducing the heating costs, which is difficult to achieve with inexpensive replacement windows.

They can also reduce exterior air infiltration significantly. Storm windows are an inexpensive add-on: even the best storm windows - three track exterior windows with low-E glass – will cost a small fraction of the price of standard replacement windows.

Interior storm windows can produce problems of condensation and be visually obstructive; exterior storm windows can have a negative visual effect.

The negative visual effect can be minimized by using single line storm sashes. Condensation problems can be avoided by incorporating vent holes and a sealed fit.

Types

A plastic PVC interior storm panel is particularly inexpensive and easy to install but these panels lose quality over time and may get broken quite easily. Storm windows with Low-E glass and metal frames are a more durable choice, and can provide better insulation.

Manufacturing process and applications 
There are several laminated glass manufacturing processes:

The first method utilizes two or more pieces of glass bonded between one or more pieces of plasticized polyvinyl butyric resin using heat and pressure.

The second method uses two or more pieces of glass and poly-carbonate, bonded together with aliphatic urethane inter-layer under heat and pressure.

The third type of laminated glass is interlaid with a cured resin.

Each manufacturing process may include glass layers of equal or unequal thickness.

See also
 Storm cellar
 Storm door
 Storm drain
 Storm room
 Storm shutter

References

Windows